Khmelevoy is a rural locality (a settlement) in Ikryaninsky District, Astrakhan Oblast, Russia. The population was 371 as of 2010. There are 7 streets.

Geography 
Khmelevoy is located 36 km south of Ikryanoye (the district's administrative centre) by road. Vakhromeyevo is the nearest rural locality.

References 

Rural localities in Ikryaninsky District